André Alves da Cruz (born 20 September 1968) is a Brazilian retired footballer who played as a central defender. He played for several clubs in Brazil and Europe, and also represented the Brazil national team, taking part in the 1989 and 1995 Copa América tournaments, and the 1998 FIFA World Cup, as well as the 1987 Pan American Games and the 1988 Summer Olympics.

Club career 
Cruz began his playing career with Brazilian clubs Ponte Preta and Flamengo, before moving to play football in Europe. He initially joined Belgian club Standard Liège, but later also played in Italy, where he represented Napoli, A.C. Milan, and Torino. He subsequently joined Portuguese side Sporting Clube de Portugal, before moving back to Brazil, where he played with Goiás and Internacional before ending his career.

International career 
André Cruz made 47 appearances (12 in non-official matches) with the Brazil national team between 1988 and 1998. With the Brazil under-20 side, he won a gold medal at the 1987 Pan American Games in Indianapolis, and a silver medal at the 1988 Summer Olympics in Seoul; he was a member of the Brazil senior team that won the 1989 Copa América the following year. He was included in the Brazilian team that won the 1995 Umbro Cup and which finished runners-up in the 1995 Copa América; he was later also a member of the Brazilian squad that finished runners-up in the 1998 FIFA World Cup.

Honours

Club 
Flamengo
Copa do Brasil: 1990

Internacional
Campeonato Gaúcho 2003

Standard Liège
Belgian Cup: 1992–93

Milan
 Serie A: 1998–99

Sporting
 SuperLiga: 1999–2000, 2001–02
 Supertaça Cândido de Oliveira: 2000
 Taça de Portugal: 2001–02

International 
Brazil
 Pan American Games Gold Medal: 1987
 Summer Olympic Silver Medal: 1988
 Copa América: 1989, Runner-up 1995
 Umbro Cup: 1995.
 FIFA World Cup Runner-up: 1998

References

External links 
 

1968 births
Living people
People from Piracicaba
S.S.C. Napoli players
A.C. Milan players
Torino F.C. players
Serie A players
Brazilian footballers
Standard Liège players
Belgian Pro League players
Sporting CP footballers
Primeira Liga players
CR Flamengo footballers
Sport Club Internacional players
Associação Atlética Ponte Preta players
Goiás Esporte Clube players
Campeonato Brasileiro Série A players
1989 Copa América players
1995 Copa América players
1998 FIFA World Cup players
Footballers at the 1988 Summer Olympics
Olympic footballers of Brazil
Olympic silver medalists for Brazil
Brazil youth international footballers
Brazil under-20 international footballers
Brazil international footballers
Brazilian expatriate footballers
Expatriate footballers in Italy
Expatriate footballers in Portugal
Expatriate footballers in Belgium
Olympic medalists in football
Copa América-winning players
Pan American Games gold medalists for Brazil
Medalists at the 1988 Summer Olympics
Association football defenders
Pan American Games medalists in football
Footballers at the 1987 Pan American Games
Medalists at the 1987 Pan American Games
Footballers from São Paulo (state)